San Calixto is a Colombian  municipality located in the department of Norte de Santander.

References
 San Calixto official website
 Government of Norte de Santander - San Calixto

Municipalities of the Norte de Santander Department